Assam Gas based power plant is Combined Cycle Gas Turbine Project joint venture of NTPC and NEEPCO located in the Dibrugarh District of Assam. Capacity of this power plant is 291 MW ( 6 X 33.50 ) Gas Turbines ( 3 X 30.00 )Steam Turbines.

References 

Power stations in Assam
Natural gas-fired power stations in India
Dibrugarh district
Year of establishment missing